Kammerflimmer Kollektief is a German musical group, founded by Thomas Weber, consisting of Heike Aumüller, Johannes Frisch, Christopher Brunner, Heike Wendelin, and D. Wurm. They play a mixture of jazz, noise, electronic music, free jazz and experimental music. Formed in 1997, they have released to date 8 albums, and have appeared on many jazz and electronic compilation albums. In 2012 they formed the band The Schwarzenbach together with German writer Dietmar Dath and released the album Farnschiffe.

Discography 
 Mäander, Payola (Europe) - 1999 / Temporary Residence Limited (United States) - 2001
 Incommunicado , Temporary Residence Limited (United States) - 2001 / Payola (Europe) - 1999
 Hysteria, Bubblecore (United States) / Payola (Europe) / After Hours (Japan) - 2001
 Cicadidae, Staubgold (Germany)/ Temporary Residence Limited (United States) - 2003
 Absencen, Staubgold - 2005
 Jinx, Staubgold - 2007
 Remixed (part I and II), Staubgold, features remixes of previous EPs.
 Im erwachten Garten (with Dietmar Dath), Implex/Staubgold/Verbrecher - 2009
 Wildling, Staubgold - 2010
 Teufelskamin, Staubgold - 2011
 Farnschiffe (as The Schwarzenbach with Dietmar Dath), ZickZack - 2012

Compilations 
Einigen Wir Uns Auf Die Zukunft, Various Artists
CD/2xLP, Kitty-Yo, Payola, Kollaps 1997
Tempo Technik Teamwork, Various Artists, Staubgold 2004
Thank You, Various Artists, Temporary Residence Limited 2004
Born Again: Collected Remixes 1999-2005, Sutekh
2xCD/LP, Leaf 2005
Childish Music, Various Artists, Staubgold 2005
Parerga, En/Of 028 12 inch, En/Of 2005, Limited Edition LP and artwork by De Rijke/De Rooij
4 Photos, each 20 x 30 cm, Edition of 100, signed & numbered on a certificate
En/Of 001-030, Various Artists 3xCD, En/Of 2005
Jukebox Buddha, Various Artists, Staubgold 2006, 15 tracks made with the FM3 Buddha Machine. Feat. Adrian Sherwood + Doug Wimbish, Blixa Bargeld, sunnO))), Thomas Fehlmann, Sun City Girls, Mapstation, Robert Henke a.o.
Absencen Remixed 2x12"/CD, Staubgold 2005/2006, Feat. Radian, Secondo, Lump, Sutekh, J.Jelinek, A.Takamasa, Nôze & David Last a.o
Kammerflimmer Kollektief / Strings Of Consciousness 10 inch, Karl-Records 2007
Handnumbered edition of 500 items
Bip-Hop Generation Vol. 9, Various Artists, Bip-Hop 2008
Fantomastique Acoustica, Strings of Consciousness, Off Rds 2008
Dinner Music For Clubbers: Peter Grummich Plays Staubgold, Staubgold 2008, No boundaries, just hot shit with love!“
Muting The Noise, Various Artists, Innervisions 2008 feat. Âme, Henrik Schwarz, Terre Thaemlitz a.o.
Rauschgold: Alec Empire Plays Staubgold, Staubgold 2009

References

External links
 Kammerflimmer Kollektief website

German jazz ensembles
Temporary Residence Limited artists